Li King-Ho (born 21 August 1960) is a Taiwanese modern pentathlete. He competed at the 1988 Summer Olympics.

References

1960 births
Living people
Taiwanese male modern pentathletes
Olympic modern pentathletes of Taiwan
Modern pentathletes at the 1988 Summer Olympics